Andrei Semyonovich Mendel (born 17 April 1995) is a Russian football midfielder. He plays for FC Fakel Voronezh.

Club career
He made his debut in the Russian Second Division for FC Biolog-Novokubansk on 4 August 2013 in a game against FC Mashuk-KMV Pyatigorsk.

He made his Russian Football National League debut for FC Khimki on 7 July 2019 in a game against FC Luch Vladivostok.

Mendel made his Russian Premier League debut for FC Fakel Voronezh on 17 July 2022 against FC Krasnodar.

Career statistics

References

External links
 
 

1995 births
Sportspeople from Krasnodar Krai
People from Dinskoy District
Living people
Russian footballers
Association football midfielders
FC Armavir players
FC Chernomorets Novorossiysk players
FC Khimki players
FC Volgar Astrakhan players
FC Fakel Voronezh players
Russian Premier League players
Russian First League players
Russian Second League players